Igor Lisovenko (born 19 March 1988 in Taganrog) is a Russian sailor. He competed at the 2008 and 2012 Summer Olympics in the Men's Laser class, finishing in 11th and 27th place respectively.

References

External links 
 
 
 

1988 births
Living people
Olympic sailors of Russia
Russian male sailors (sport)
Sailors at the 2008 Summer Olympics – Laser
Sailors at the 2012 Summer Olympics – Laser
Extreme Sailing Series sailors
Sportspeople from Taganrog